Erindale College may refer to:

 Erindale College (Wanniassa, Australian Capital Territory), a secondary college
 Erindale College, an alternate name for the University of Toronto Mississauga in Erindale, Ontario